Garyfallia (Liana) Kanelli (born 20 March 1954), also sometimes credited as Liana K. or simply Liana, is a Greek journalist and Member of the Greek Parliament for the Communist Party of Greece since 2000.

Education
She graduated with a law degree from the University of Athens Law School. 

Kanelli also learned to speak several foreign languages. Apart from Greek, Kanelli is also fluent in three foreign languages: English, French and Italian.

Career

Journalism and television 
In 1973, starting her career in journalism, she was acclaimed by Prime Minister Constantine Karamanlis as the "kid of New Democracy", a designation she herself denied a while later.
In the next decades Kanelli worked as a daily columnist, a reporter at home and abroad, a news anchor and television presenter, host and interviewer. She also worked as a radio host and presenter. Often playing the role of media polemicist, she is noted for her forthright, irreverent, incisive and arrogant style which is criticized by her detractors and applauded by her supporters.

Liana 
In 1992 she was given her own self-titled talk show Liana, (also called Liana K. in Greek language rebroadcasts outside of Greece). The show was widely popular and gained her much notoriety in Greece and surrounding Greek-speaking regions (such as North Macedonia and southern Albania) , though it lasted only one year, due largely to some of the controversial views she presented.

After the show was canceled it remained quite popular through the practice of underground tape trading in Eastern Europe. The trading of pirated videos and music had become quite commonplace throughout the 1980s and 1990s as so many western films were outlawed in Eastern Bloc nations (as seen in the documentary Chuck Norris vs. Communism).

Politics
In 1999, Kanelli announced from the podium of a rally protesting the Kosovo War and the NATO bombing of Yugoslavia that she would run as a candidate for the Communist Party of Greece for the European Parliament. In the 2000 national election she was elected as a Member of the Hellenic Parliament for Athens' first electoral district, a seat she has successfully held by being re-elected in every election since (2004, 2007 and 2009).

While sitting in Parliament, Kanelli continues to work as journalist with more than 35 years of professional experience in newspaper, radio and television media. She is currently the editor of Greece's communist newspaper Rizospastis. She has also been elected to the boards of several of Greece's leading journalists' unions.

Defense of Milosevic (2004) 
Liana Kanelli, a member of the International Committee for the Defense of Milosevic, testified at the Trial of Slobodan Milošević in October 2004. She attacked the United States and their allies, calling them "neo-nazis" and blaming them for the death of many innocent civilians. She also claimed Milošević would be with the "winners" instead of the "defeated" if he had cooperated more with western leaders.

On-air assault (2012) 
In June 2012, during a live talk show, Kanelli was struck three times in the shoulders and the face by Golden Dawn spokesman Ilias Kasidiaris, a former army Special forces officer with a checkered criminal past. Kanelli pushed him away after Kasidiaris threw water across the news desk at another guest, and a warrant was issued for Kasidiaris' arrest immediately following the on air incident. The show stopped broadcasting after the melee, at which time, according to Kanelli, Kasidiaris was forced into a room and the door was closed and locked, but that before police could arrive he broke the door down and fled the scene. According to Greek law, such a warrant must be served by police within 24 hours. Following the incident, which gained international attention, Golden Dawn claimed Kanelli assaulted Kasidiaris first by throwing a packet of documents into his face.

Al Jazeera interview (2013) 
Kanelli has been an outspoken opponent of Greek's entry into the European Union and adoption of the Euro as a currency. In an October 2013 interview with Al Jazeera's Empire program in Athens she caused a stir by stating that Brussels and Berlin had utilized "imposing and blackmailing politics" to mislead Greece into accepting the currency.

Author 
Kanelli has written three books: “Thoughts”, “Function of Oaths” and “Rwanda”.

She also established NEMECIS magazine in 1997.

Humanitarian efforts and awards 
A member of EEDYE (Greek Committee for International Peace and Detente), Kanelli has been awarded by various associations and organizations as a journalist and politician for her social and anti-racist efforts. This includes the National Silver Medal presented to her in 2015 by Serbian President Tomislav Nikolić for "exceptional merits in public and cultural activities".

She also visited Armenia in 2016 to promote peace in the region with Azerbaijan and Nagorno-Karabakh, blaming "capitalist rivalries" for previous bloodshed there.

References

External links 
 
 Liana Kanelli's IMDb page
 Article documenting Mrs Kanelli's change of party
 Kanelli member of the Council of Europe
 On Kanelli's Defence of Milosevic
 Media History of Liana Kanelli
 EU commission on journalism
 Rizospastis - Official publication of KKE/The Greek Communist Party, edited by Kanelli

1954 births
Living people
Politicians from Athens
Communist Party of Greece politicians
Greek women journalists
Greek MPs 2000–2004
Greek MPs 2004–2007
Greek MPs 2007–2009
Greek MPs 2009–2012
Greek MPs 2012 (May)
Greek MPs 2012–2014
Greek MPs 2015 (February–August)
Greek MPs 2015–2019
20th-century Greek politicians
20th-century Greek women politicians
21st-century Greek politicians
21st-century Greek women politicians
Greek MPs 2019–2023
Writers from Athens